Merscheid (Luxembourgish: Mierschent) is a village in northeastern Luxembourg.

It is situated in the commune of Putscheid and has a population of 157.

References 

Villages in Luxembourg